Pierre Gönczy (born 1962 in Winterthur, Switzerland) is a Swiss and Italian cell and developmental biologist. His research focuses on  centriole biology and asymmetric cell division. He is currently professor at École Polytechnique Fédérale de Lausanne (EPFL), where he directs the Laboratory of Cell and Developmental Biology.

Career 
Gönczy studied biology at University of Geneva and graduated in 1987 with a diploma thesis in molecular immunology at the Department of Microbiology at University of Geneva. In 1995, he received a PhD for his work on developmental biology and molecular genetics from the Rockefeller University, New York City, United States. From 1996 to 2000 Gönczy joined the European Molecular Biology Laboratory (EMBL) in Heidelberg, Germany as a postdoctoral research fellow  with Anthony Hyman to work on cell biology, cell division, and early embryonic development. In 2000, he became Junior Group leader at Swiss Institute for Experimental Cancer Research (ISREC) in Lausanne, Switzerland. In 2005, he was first nominated Associate Professor, and since 2009 has been a Full Professor at École Polytechnique Fédérale de Lausanne (EPFL).

Research 
Gönczy's research is in the realm of cell and developmental biology, focused mainly on the questions of centriole assembly and function, as well as asymmetric cell division. His laboratory employs notably the model organism C. elegans and human cell lines in their research. The methods they use include functional genomics, cell biology, live imaging, super-resolution microscopy,  biophysical analysis, and electron cryotomography. He spearheaded the first ever functional genomic screening of a metazoan organism, leading to the systematic discovery of the function of the compendium of genes needed to build an embryo.

Distinctions 
Gönczy is recipient of the EMBO Young Investigator Program Award (2000). In 2005, he was elected an EMBO member. He was co-founder of the startup company Cenix Bioscience. He was a Whitman Fellow at the Marine Biology Laboratory, Woods Hole, USA in 2015, 2017, and 2018.

Select publications

References

External links 

 
 Publications indexed on ORCID: 
 Website of the Laboratory of Cell and Developmental Biology

Living people
1962 births
University of Geneva alumni
Rockefeller University alumni
Academic staff of the École Polytechnique Fédérale de Lausanne
Molecular biologists
Members of the European Molecular Biology Organization
People from Winterthur